Basilikos, is a Greek epithet deriving from the title basileus, and means "royal" or "imperial". It can refer to:

Titles
The epithet featured frequently in the titulature of Hellenistic and Byzantine courts:
 Basilikos anthropos, a term with a number of meanings in Byzantine documents of the 9th–10th centuries
 Basilikos mandator, a subaltern official in the middle Byzantine Empire
 Basilikos grammateus, or Royal Secretary, communicates a sovereign's wishes to the other members of government
 Philos basilikos, a term for hierarchic systems of titles specifically in use for court protocol

People
 Basil Basilikos (fl. 1260s), parakoimomenos of Byzantine emperor Michael VIII
 Basilikos (fl. 1300), protoierakarios of the Byzantine emperor Andronikos II